The Second Straujuma cabinet was the government of Latvia from 5 November 2014 to 11 February 2016. It was the second government to be led by Laimdota Straujuma, who was the Prime Minister from 2014 to 2016. It took office after the October 2014 parliamentary election, succeeding the first Straujuma cabinet, which lasted 8 months.

Straujuma resigned on 7 December 2015, which led to immediate discussions on the new government. On 11 February 2016, parliament approved the new government of Prime Minister Māris Kučinskis.

References

Government of Latvia
2014 establishments in Latvia
Cabinets established in 2014
2016 disestablishments in Latvia
Cabinets disestablished in 2016